This is a listing of the horses that finished in either first, second, or third place and the number of starters in the Nellie Morse Stakes (1941-present), an American Thoroughbred Stakes race for fillies and mares four years-old and up at six furlongs run on dirt at Laurel Park Racecourse  in Laurel, Maryland.

See also 

 Nellie Morse Stakes
 Laurel Park Racecourse

References

External links
 Laurel Park website

Laurel Park Racecourse